Institute of Applied Politics may refer to:

Ray C. Bliss Institute of Applied Politics,  a nonpartisan research and educational organization at the University of Akron in Akron, OH, USA
 Institute of Applied Politics, Moscow, a think tank headed by Olga Kryshtanovskaya
 Institute of Applied Politics, Lithuania,, an independent social, cultural, educational organization founded by Šarūnas Gustainis